John McKnight Bloss (January 21, 1839 – April 26, 1905) was an American Civil War soldier who had an influence on the Battle of Antietam and was later President of Oregon Agricultural College (now Oregon State University) from 1892 until 1896.

Early life and education
He was born in New Philadelphia, Indiana in 1839.

Bloss attended Hanover College in Indiana from 1854 and earned an A.B. degree with honors in 1860. After his military service in the Civil War, he studied medicine at Ohio Medical College in Cincinnati, Ohio in 1865.

American Civil War
Bloss fought on the Union side with the 27th Indiana Infantry Regiment. He was one of the soldiers who helped recover Special Order 191, "Lee's Lost Dispatch", which provided invaluable military intelligence about General Robert E. Lee's plans, resulting in the Battle of Antietam. This helped lead the Union to victory in the battle. Bloss fought and was wounded in several battles, including Antietam, before he resigned in 1864.

Career in education
He was a teacher; a principal; superintendent of the Indiana city schools of Evansville (1875–80) and Muncie (1883–86) and of Topeka, Kansas (1886–92); and the State Superintendent for Public Instruction for Indiana (1880–82). In April 1892, Bloss was selected as the third president of Oregon State University, but retired in 1896 due to his failing health.

Personal life
Bloss married Emma L. McPheeters in 1865. They had two children, Nannie and William (Will). After Emma died of typhoid in Topeka, Kansas. He remarried in 1893, after meeting Mary A. Wood while serving as OAC president.

Bloss died in 1905 and is buried in Muncie, Indiana.

Notes

References
 McPherson, James M. Crossroads of Freedom: Antietam, The Battle That Changed the Course of the Civil War. New York: Oxford University Press, 2002. .
 Sears, Stephen W. Landscape Turned Red: The Battle of Antietam. Boston: Houghton Mifflin, 1983. .

Presidents of Oregon State University
Union Army soldiers
1839 births
1905 deaths